The 1986 Big League World Series took place from August 9–16 in Fort Lauderdale, Florida, United States. Maracaibo, Venezuela defeated Broward County, Florida twice in the championship game.

Teams

Results

References

Big League World Series
Big League World Series